William Stener Ferguson (born October 12, 1964) is a Canadian travel writer and novelist who won the Scotiabank Giller Prize for his novel 419.

His parents split up when he was six years old, during a brief interlude in Regina. At the age of 16, he quit school and moved to Saskatoon, Dauphin, and Red Deer.

Ferguson is also an outspoken critic of the monarchy of Canada, both publicly and in his books, and has previously been quoted in the media during debates on Canada's monarchy. He also profiled Canadian secessionist and independence movements (such as the "Republic of Madawaska") in his book Beauty Tips from Moose Jaw (2004).

Personal life 
Ferguson completed his high school education at Lindsay Thurber Comprehensive High School (L.T.C.H.S.) in Red Deer, and was awarded the Alexander Rutherford Scholarships in all available categories. He then joined the Canadian government funded programs Katimavik and Canada World Youth. The latter program sent him to Ecuador in South America, as described in his book Why I Hate Canadians. He studied film production and screenwriting at York University in Toronto, graduating with a B.F.A. (Special Honours) in 1990.

He currently resides in Calgary, Alberta. His son Genki Ferguson is the author of the novel Satellite Love. His older brother, Ian Ferguson, won the Stephen Leacock Medal for his memoir Village of the Small Houses in 2004. Another brother, Sean Ferguson, is currently the dean of music at McGill University. 

Ferguson joined the JET Programme in the early 1990s, and lived in Kyushu, Japan, for five years teaching English. He married his wife, Terumi, in Kumamoto in 1995. After coming back from Japan, he experienced a severe reverse culture shock, which became the basis for his first book, Why I Hate Canadians. He details his experiences hitchhiking across Japan in Hokkaido Highway Blues, later retitled Hitching Rides with Buddha.

Awards and honours
Ferguson was a runner-up for the 1999 Edna Staebler Award for Creative Non-Fiction for I Was a Teenage Katima Victim: A Canadian Odyssey.

Ferguson has won the Stephen Leacock Memorial Medal for Humour three times: first for Generica (later renamed Happiness) in 2002, then for Beauty Tips from Moose Jaw in 2005 and for his travel memoir Beyond Belfast in 2010.

Ferguson won the 2012 Giller Prize for 419 (2012). The novel went on to win the 2013 Libris Award from the Canadian Booksellers Association for Fiction Book of the Year.

He also served on the jury of the 2015 Hilary Weston Prize for literary nonfiction.

In 2021, he won the Crime Writers of Canada Award for Best Novel for The Finder.

Ferguson is on the board of directors of the Chawkers Foundation, which provides support for literary, artistic, environmental and educational projects. In 2016, he received an honorary degree in English from Mount Royal University.

Other activities
Ferguson championed Sarah Binks by Paul Hiebert in Canada Reads 2003.

Bibliography

 Why I Hate Canadians (1997)
 I Was a Teenage Katima-Victim! (1998)
 Hokkaido Highway Blues (1998), republished in 2005 as Hitching Rides with Buddha
 The Hitchhiker's Guide to Japan (1998)
 Bastards and Boneheads: Canada's Glorious Leaders, Past and Present (1999)
 Canadian History for Dummies (2000, revised 2005)
 Generica (2001), winner of the Stephen Leacock Medal for Humour, later republished as Happiness™
 How to Be a Canadian (2001), cowritten with Ian Ferguson
 Beauty Tips from Moose Jaw: Travels in Search of Canada (2004), winner of the Stephen Leacock Medal for Humour
 The Penguin Anthology of Canadian Humour (editor) (2006)
 Spanish Fly (2007) published in the UK as Hustle
 Beyond Belfast: A 560-Mile Walk Across Northern Ireland on Sore Feet (2009), winner of the Stephen Leacock Medal for Humour
 Coal Dust Kisses: A Christmas Memoir (2010)
 Canadian Pie (2011)
 419 (2012), winner of the Scotiabank Giller Prize
 Road Trip Rwanda: A Journey into the New Heart of Africa (2015)
 The Shoe on the Roof (2017)
 The Finder (2020), winner of the 2021 Crime Writers of Canada Award for Best Novel

References

External links
 
 

1964 births
Canadian memoirists
Canadian male novelists
Writers from Alberta
People from Mackenzie County
Living people
Canadian republicans
Stephen Leacock Award winners
Canadian expatriates in Japan
York University alumni
21st-century Canadian novelists
Canadian travel writers
Canadian male essayists
21st-century Canadian essayists
21st-century Canadian male writers
21st-century memoirists